Romanian singer and actress Alina Eremia has released two studio albums, one EP, 43 singles (including ten as a featured artist) and seven promotional singles. Her YouTube channel surpassed 225 million total views as of March 2022.

Albums

Studio albums

EP

Singles

As lead artist

As featured artist

Promotional singles

References

External links 

 AlinaEremia.ro Official website
[ Alina Eremia] discography at Allmusic

Discographies of Romanian artists